Dinabandhu Mahavidyalay, is a general degree college in Bongaon, North 24 Parganas in the Indian state of West Bengal. It mainly offers undergraduate courses in arts, science and commerce. It is currently affiliated to West Bengal State University (formerly affiliated to University of Calcutta).

History
It was established in 1947 when Bongaon High School served as its birthplace. The college is named after Dinabandhu Mitra, a Bengali dramatist, who is primarily known for his play Nil Darpan, which is about the plight of indigo farmers. This college was established for providing quality higher education to the largely middle and lower-middle class population of the town of Bongaon and its rural areas because that point of time there was no college in this locality.
In 2022, the college observed its 75th anniversary.

Departments

Undergraduate

Science

Chemistry
Physics
Mathematics 
Botany
Zoology
Computer Science
Anthropology

Arts and Commerce

Bengali
English
Sanskrit
History 

Geography
Political Science
Philosophy
Economics
Commerce

Postgraduate
Post-Graduate course in Bengali started from the session  2008-2009 under West Bengal State University. It also offers Post-Graduation courses under the Directorate of Open and Distance Learning of University of Kalyani in History, English, Bengali and Education from the 2009-2010 session.

Accreditation
Dinabandhu Mahavidyalay is recognized by the University Grants Commission (UGC). It was accredited by the National Assessment and Accreditation Council (NAAC), and awarded B grade, an accreditation that has since then expired.

See also
Education in India
List of colleges in West Bengal
Education in West Bengal

References

External links
Dinabandhu Mahavidyalay

Educational institutions established in 1947
Colleges affiliated to West Bengal State University
Universities and colleges in North 24 Parganas district
1947 establishments in India